Yangluo Development Zone Station, is a station on the Yangluo Line of the Wuhan Metro. It entered revenue service on December 26, 2017. It is located in Xinzhou District.

Station layout

References

Wuhan Metro stations
Yangluo Line, Wuhan Metro
Railway stations in China opened in 2017